Tortricopsis semijunctella is a moth of the family Oecophoridae. It is found in Australia.

The larvae feed on dead leaves of Eucalyptus species. It can also be a pest on Pinus radiata and Juniperus, with caterpillars boring into the stems of young shoots.

References

Oecophoridae